USS Mississippi, named either for the state of Mississippi or the Mississippi River, may refer to:

 was a sidewheel frigate that saw action in the Mexican–American War and was lost during the American Civil War
 was a  nuclear-powered guided missile cruiser
 is a  commissioned in 2012

See also
 refers to several United States Army Corps of Engineers towboats
 refers to a projected ironclad of the Confederate States Navy
CSS Mississippi was a projected Confederate ironclad turret ram eventually completed as HMS Wivern (1863)

United States Navy ship names